The following is a list of (natural) harbours in Hong Kong:

 Victoria Harbour
 Aberdeen Harbour
 Double Haven
 Port Shelter
 Inner Port Shelter
 Tolo Harbour
 Tai Tam Harbour
 Rocky Harbour
 Three Fathoms Cove

See also
 List of places in Hong Kong

External links
 Harbours, channels and bays in Hong Kong

Harbours
Harbours